The William Leonard Crowder Home Place, at 1615 Handy Rd. in Coweta County, Georgia near Newnan, Georgia, was built in 1880. It was listed on the National Register of Historic Places in 1986.

It includes a two-story, L-shaped, wood-framed farmhouse built upon a granite foundation in the 1880s, expanded to the rear in 1948 and with side porches added in 1981.  Its historic front porch has Victorian gingerbread detailing.

References

National Register of Historic Places in Coweta County, Georgia
Victorian architecture in Georgia (U.S. state)
Houses completed in 1880